United States v. Paul may refer to:
United States v. Paul, 31 U.S. (6 Pet.) 141 (1832), crimes under state law committed on federal property

See also
Paul v. United States, 20 Cl. Ct. 236 (1990), advising Congress whether payment to an individual was required